Walter Watson may refer to:
 Walter Watson (footballer), English footballer
 Walter Watson (priest), Anglican priest
 Walter Watson (banker), Scottish-American banker. 
 Walter Allen Watson, Virginia lawyer and politician